Jurowski, Jurovský, Yurovski, Yurovskiy or Yurovsky is a Slavic masculine surname, its feminine counterpart is Jurowska, Jurowskaya, Yurovskaya or Yurovskaia. It may refer to

Dmitri Jurowski (born 1979), German conductor, son of Michail and grandson of Vladimir Michailovich
Michail Jurowski (1945–2022), Russian conductor, son of Vladimir Michailovich
Vladimir Jurowski (born 1972), Russian conductor, son of Mikhail and grandson of Vladimir Michailovich; brother of Dmitri
Vladimir Michailovich Jurowski (1915–1972), Soviet film music composer
Šimon Jurovský (1912–1963), Slovak composer
Yakov Yurovsky (1878–1938), Soviet revolutionary